The Southern Football Alliance is a mega-conference for high school football in southeast Minnesota. It was formed in March 2013  and is the combination of schools that belong to both the Three Rivers Conference and the Hiawatha Valley League for other sports. The alliance is divided into three divisions, Red, White, and Blue, based on each school's enrollment.

Summary
The Minnesota State High School League has a football season that is 8 weeks long, ending the week of the Minnesota Education Association's annual conference. This results in each team playing its divisional opponents once. Because the Red and White Divisions each have 8 teams, that results in 7 division games for each team and one game against a team from the other division. The Blue Division has 9 teams, meaning all 8 games will be against divisional opponents. Each Blue Division team receives a bye during the season which facilitates a Week 0, that is played one week earlier than the Red and White Divisions.

Due to scheduling conflicts with TCF Bank Stadium (where the state semi-final and final games are to be played) for the 2015 season, the schedule will begin one week earlier than normal on August 21, 2015.

Divisions

Red Division
Byron High School
Cannon Falls High School
Kasson-Mantorville High School
LaCrescent High School
Lake City High School
Plainview-Elgin-Millville High School
Rochester Lourdes High School
Stewartville High School

White Division
Dover-Eyota High School
Kenyon-Wanamingo High School
Lewiston-Altura High School
Pine Island High School
St. Charles High School
Triton High School
Winona Cotter High School
Zumbrota-Mazeppa High School

Blue Division
Caledonia High School
Chatfield High School
Filmore Central High School
Goodhue High School
Hayfield High School
Kingsland High School
Rushford-Peterson High School
Southland High School
Wabasha-Kellogg High School

References

Sports organizations of the United States
Sports organizations established in 2013